Do You Remember Me? may refer to:

 Do You Remember Me? (film), a 2014 comedy film
 "Do You Remember Me?", a song performed by Perry Como
 "Lila's Theme", known as "Do You Remember Me?", a song from a 1972 film Snoopy, Come Home
 "Do You Remember Me?", a 1986 single by Jermaine Jackson
 "Do You Remember Me?", a 1990 single by Amanda Lear
 "Do You Remember Me?", a 1995 song by Wizo
 "Do You Remember Me?", a 2000 song by Lucy Street